An American in Buenos Aires (Spanish: Una Americana en Buenos Aires) is a 1961  Argentine film directed by George Cahan. The film was based on the story by Antonio de Lara. The film starred Mamie Van Doren and Jean-Pierre Aumont. It is also known by the alternative title of The Blonde from Buenos Aires.

The movie was Van Doren's last film for three years; fore, she didn't return to the screen until 1964, playing the lead role in The Candidate.

Cast 
 Mamie Van Doren   
 Jean-Pierre Aumont   
 Carlos Estrada   
 Catherine Zabó   
 Juan Carlos Mareco   
 Nathán Pinzón   
 Guido Gorgatti   
 Chela Ruíz

External links 
 

1961 films
1960s Spanish-language films
1961 romantic comedy films
Films set in Buenos Aires
Films with screenplays by Antonio de Lara
Argentine romantic comedy films
1960s Argentine films